Hromitsa is a village in Ardino Municipality, Kardzhali Province, southern-central Bulgaria. It covers an area of 3.251 square kilometres and as of 2007 had a population of 43 people.

References

Villages in Kardzhali Province